Connor, (from Conchobar, is an Irish name meaning "Wolf Kin", "Lover of Wolves" or "Lover of Hounds")

Clans and family names
 O'Connor (surname) (kin of Connor), of Irish origin mostly found in Ireland.
 MacConnor or McConnor comes from Irish Mac Conchobhair, son of Conchobhair

Notable people
 Bull Connor (1897–1973), American police official and segregationist
 Connie Yerwood Connor (1908–1991), Texas physician
 Dutch Connor (1895–1978), American football player and coach
 George Connor (American football) (1925–2003), American football player
 George Connor (racing driver) (1906–2001), American racecar driver
 Geraldine Connor (1952–2011), British ethnomusicologist, theatre director, composer and performer
 Henry Connor (disambiguation), several people
 Jack Connor (footballer, born 1911) (1911–1994), Scottish footballer
 Jack Connor (footballer, born 1934) (1934–2010), English footballer
 Jake Connor, English rugby player
 Jimmy Connor (footballer, born 1881), Scottish footballer
 Jimmy Connor (footballer, born 1909), Scottish footballer
 Joe Connor (disambiguation), several people
 John Connor (disambiguation), several people
 Kenneth Connor (1918–1993), English actor
 Kevin Connor (artist), Australian artist
 Kevin Connor (director), film and TV director
 Kimberly Connor, American boxer and mixed martial artist
 Kit Connor, English actor
 Kyle Connor (born 1996), American ice hockey player
 Laura Connor, British ballet dancer
 Mark Connor, American baseball coach
 Patrick Edward Connor (1820–1891), 19th-century American general
 Pearl Connor (1924–2005), Trinidadian theatrical and literary agent, actress and cultural activist
 Roger Connor (1857–1931), American baseball player, hall of fame inductee
 Roger G. Connor (1926-1999), American jurist
 Rose Connor (1892–1970), American architect
 Sarah Connor (singer), German singer
 Seldon Connor (1839–1917), American soldier
 Steven Connor, English writer, professor and cultural critic
 William D. Connor (1864–1944), Canadian-born American politician, lieutenant governor of Wisconsin

Fictional characters
 Aidan Connor, a character from Coronation Street
Carla Connor, a character from Coronation Street
Jenny Connor, a character from Coronation Street
Johnny Connor, a character from Coronation Street
John Connor, protagonist in the Terminator franchise
Kate Connor, a character from Coronation Street
Liam Connor, a character from Coronation Street
Maria Connor, a character from Coronation Street
Michelle Connor, a character from Coronation Street
Paul Connor, a character from Coronation Street
Ryan Connor, a character from Coronation Street
 Sarah Connor (Terminator), mother of John Connor
 Connor, protagonist in Assassin's Creed III
Connor, from Detroit: Become Human
Nick Connor, a character from Static Shock
Maureen "Permafrost" Connor, a character from Static Shock

See also
Connor (given name)
Conner (surname)
Connors (surname)
Connor (disambiguation)
O'Conor

References

Surnames
English-language surnames
Surnames of Irish origin
Surnames of British Isles origin